The Glover Park–Dupont Circle Line, designated Route D2, is a daily bus route operated by the Washington Metropolitan Area Transit Authority between Glover Park and Dupont Circle station of the Red Line of the Washington Metro. The line operates every 20-24 minutes during the day and every 40 minutes during the evening. Route D2 trips are roughly 20 minutes long.

Background
Route D2 operates daily between Glover Park and Dupont Circle station connecting Glover Park, Burleith, and Georgetown residents to Metrorail as there are no stations in Georgetown. Route D2 currently operates out of Western division. The line primarily uses 30ft Orion VII BRTs since the line primarily uses small buses due to ridership and DC's Small Bus Program, but sometimes utilizes regular 40 ft buses from Western. During its times, the line would use Orion IIs and 30 ft Orion Vs prior to the 30 ft Orion VIIs.

History
The Glover Park Line was originally operated under the Washington Railway & Electric Company prior to it merging with the Capital Traction Company in 1933. Route D1 originally began operating between Glover Park and Downtown under the Capital Street Company. The line at first were operated by streetcars, but then formed into buses on March 1, 1925. The line was later operated until DC Transit in 1956 and then acquired by WMATA on February 4, 1973. 

On July 1, 1977, route D2 was extended to Stadium–Armory station when Blue Line service began operation. Route D2 would primarily operate along Q, E, K, and C Streets between Glover Park and Stadium–Armory. The line would operate as the Glover Park-Trinidad Line.

In 1995, route D2 was shorten to Dupont Circle station. Service to Stadium–Armory station was replaced by a rerouted route D6 which would operate along the former route D2 to Stadium–Armory. Additionally, a new route D1 was created to supplement route D2 during the weekday peak-hours to Washington Union Station. The line was then renamed to the Glover Park–Dupont Circle Line.

On December 19, 2010, route D2 was changed from a loop operation to two directional routes with terminals at Dupont Circle station and at Glover Park.

In 2019, WMATA proposed to combine routes D2 and G2 into one route. The new route would be named route G2 and would operate on the D2 and G2 routing between Glover Park and Howard University along Q and P streets. Service to Georgetown on route G2 would be discontinued. This was in order to consolidate all services operating between Dupont Circle and Wisconsin Avenue into
one alignment on Q Street NW, which would allow customers to wait at Q Street bus stops for multiple services and to eliminate inefficiencies of operating services one block from each other on P and Q Streets NW. 

The proposal was met with controversy with residents due to service being lacking in Georgetown if the proposal goes through. Resident didn't want the change to happen as they would have to walk to further bus stops or transfer to other buses instead of having a one seat ride to their destinations. WMATA later backed out of the proposal due to major customer opposition.

During the COVID-19 pandemic, route D2 was reduced to operate on its Sunday schedule beginning on March 16, 2020. However on March 18, 2020, the route was further reduced to operate on its Sunday service. All weekend service was also suspended beginning on March 21, 2020. On June 28, 2020, route D2 service was reduced even further operating every 40 minutes only between 6:30 a.m. to 11:00 a.m. and 1:30 p.m. to 6:30 p.m. during the weekdays only. On August 23, 2020, additional service was added to the D2 but weekend service remained suspended.

In September 2020, WMATA proposed to eliminate all route D2 weekend service due to low federal funding. Route D2 has not operated during weekends since March 21, 2020 due to Metro's response to the COVID-19 pandemic. However on March 14, 2021, route D2 weekend service was restored.

In February 2021, WMATA proposed to eliminate the D2 and combine it with the M4 and N6 if WMATA does not get any federal funding. The new N6 will operate along the D2 routing between Glover Park and Dupont Circle station, then operate along the N6 routing inside Cathedral Heights, then operate on the M4 routing along Nebraska Avenue to Sibley Memorial Hospital. However the D2 loop inside Glover Park would be eliminated.

References

D2